Slepche is a village in Municipality of Dolneni, central North Macedonia.
Village is located on the northwestern part of Municipality of Dolneni.

Demographics
As of 2021, the village has 34 inhabitants and the ethnic composition was the following:
 Macedonians - 24
 Vlachs - 6
Persons for whom data are taken from administrative sources 4

References 

Villages in Dolneni Municipality